Sir Francis Hopkins, 1st Baronet (2 August 1756 – 19 September 1814) was an Anglo-Irish politician.

Hopkins was the son of Francis Hopkins and Martha Burton. He worked as a land agent and magistrate. In the latter role he was responsible for leading a company of militia in the dispersal of a group of United Irishmen. He was rewarded by being made a baronet, of Athboy in the Baronetage of Ireland, on 25 July 1795. Hopkins was the Member of Parliament for Kilbeggan in the Irish House of Commons between 1798 and 1800, shortly before the seat's disenfranchisement under the Acts of Union 1800.

He married Eleanor Thompson and they had three children. Hopkins was succeeded in his title by his only son, also called Francis.

References

1756 births
1814 deaths
18th-century Anglo-Irish people
19th-century Anglo-Irish people
Baronets in the Baronetage of Ireland
Irish justices of the peace
Irish MPs 1798–1800
Members of the Parliament of Ireland (pre-1801) for County Westmeath constituencies